The Nzoia barb (Enteromius yongei) is a species of cyprinid fish.

It is found only in Kenya.
Its natural habitat is freshwater lakes. It is not considered a threatened species by the IUCN.

References

Enteromius
Cyprinid fish of Africa
Taxa named by Peter James Palmer Whitehead
Fish described in 1960
Taxonomy articles created by Polbot